George DeGraw Moore (February 11, 1822 – October 13, 1891) was an American politician, lawyer, and jurist. He was sometimes referred to in historical documents as "G. DeGraw Moore" or "J. DeGraw Moore."

Biography

Born in Caldwell, New Jersey, Moore received his law degree from Union College, in Schenectady, New York, and studied law in a law office in Newark, New Jersey. Moore settled in Prairie du Sac, Wisconsin. He served in the Wisconsin State Senate in 1850 and 1851. In 1851, Moore moved to Urbana, Ohio. In 1856, Moore moved back to Newark, New Jersey. From 1869 to 1879, he served as surrogate for Essex County, New Jersey. He also served on the first board of directors of the Prudential Friendly Society, a predecessor to the Prudential Life Insurance Company.

Notes

1822 births
1891 deaths
People from Caldwell, New Jersey
Politicians from Newark, New Jersey
People from Urbana, Ohio
People from Prairie du Sac, Wisconsin
Prudential Financial people
Union College (New York) alumni
New Jersey state court judges
Wisconsin lawyers
Businesspeople from Newark, New Jersey
Wisconsin state senators
Lawyers from Newark, New Jersey
19th-century American politicians
19th-century American businesspeople
19th-century American judges
19th-century American lawyers